The Ocean State Open was a golf tournament on the LPGA Tour from 1988 to 1989. It was played at the Alpine Country Club in Cranston, Rhode Island.

Winners
Mitsubishi Motors Ocean State Open
1989 Tina Barrett

Ocean State Open
1988 Patty Jordan

References

External links
Alpine Country Club

Former LPGA Tour events
Golf in Rhode Island
Recurring sporting events established in 1988
Recurring sporting events disestablished in 1989
1988 establishments in Rhode Island
1989 disestablishments in Rhode Island
History of women in Rhode Island